The Social Action, Responsibility and Heroism Act 2015 (c. 3) is an Act of the Parliament of the United Kingdom.

The Social Action, Responsibility and Heroism Bill was introduced to the House of Commons as a Government bill by the Secretary of State for Justice, Chris Grayling on 12 June 2014, and given the Royal Assent on 12 February 2015, coming into force as the Social Action, Responsibility and Heroism Act 2015 on 13 April 2015.

Background 

The 2010 Conservative–Liberal Democrat coalition agreement contained a commitment to "take a range of measures to encourage volunteering and involvement in social action".

The Social Action, Responsibility and Heroism Bill was introduced to the House of Commons as a Government bill by the Secretary of State for Justice, Chris Grayling on 12 June 2014. The Bill was noted for its brevity, at just over 300 words. The Bill was introduced to the House of Lords by the Minister of State for Justice, Lord Faulks, on 21 October 2014, where the criticism of Lord Pannick was noted for its intensity. The Act was given the Royal Assent on 12 February 2015, and came into force on 13 April 2015.

Act 
The Act extends only to England and Wales.

Commentary

Necessity 
The opposition Labour Party described the bill as a "vacuous waste of time". Lord Pannick called it "the most ridiculous piece of legislation approved by Parliament in a very long time".

As of May 2020, there have been no reported cases of the provisions within the Act having been applied.

Notes

References

Bibliography 
 

United Kingdom Acts of Parliament 2015
Parliament of the United Kingdom